National Secondary Route 243, or just Route 243 (or ) is a National Road Route of Costa Rica, located in the San José, Puntarenas provinces. It connects Route 2 and Route 34.

Description
The road starts at the northeast in San Isidro de El General district and continues southwest to the Dominical beach area in the Pacific coast.

In San José province the route covers Pérez Zeledón canton (San Isidro de El General, Barú districts).

In Puntarenas province the route covers Quepos canton (Savegre district).

History
This road was created around the time of the development of the Pan-American Highway as an access road for the transportation of construction goods and equipment.

References

Highways in Costa Rica